Kuldeep Ghadvi (born 15 September 1986) is an Indian cricketer. He made his Twenty20 debut for Gujarat in the 2015–16 Syed Mushtaq Ali Trophy on 10 January 2016.

References

External links
 

1986 births
Living people
Indian cricketers
Gujarat cricketers
People from Mehsana district